A tynged ("doom, fate, destiny", plural tynghedau) is the Welsh equivalent of the Irish geis, similar to being under a vow, curse or spell. The most famous example is that placed by Arianrhod on her son Lleu Llaw Gyffes in the fourth of the Four Branches of the Mabinogi, the Mabinogi of Math fab Mathonwy.

References
 Ifans, Dafydd & Rhiannon, Y Mabinogion (Gomer 1980) 

Welsh mythology